Baggywrinkle is a soft covering for cables (or any other obstructions) to reduce sail chafe. There are many points in the rig of a large sailing ship where the sails come into contact with the standing rigging; unprotected sails would soon develop holes at the points of contact. Baggywrinkle provides a softer wearing surface for the sail.

Baggywrinkle is made from short pieces of yarn cut from old lines that have been taken out of service. Two parallel lengths of marline are stretched between fixed points, and the lengths of yarn are attached using a hitch called a "railroad sennit". This creates a long, shaggy fringe which, when the marline is wound around a cable, becomes a large hairy cylinder.

References

See also
 Spreader patch
 Stanchion patch

External links

The Arts of the Sailor on Google Books

Sailing ship components